Irreligion in South Korea makes up 56% of the population saying they are not affiliated with a religion, as of the 2015 national census.

Irreligion should not be confused with atheism, as a vast majority of Koreans believe in ancestral worship and deities due to the significant influences of Buddhism and Confucianism in the country, similar to many other countries in other parts of Asia. Therefore, with Buddhism and Confucianism incorporation into traditional Korean culture, it is now considered a philosophy and cultural background rather than a formal religion.

As a result, many people outside of the practicing population are deeply influenced by these traditions. Thus, when counting secular believers or those influenced by the faith while not following other religions, the number of Buddhists in South Korea is considered to be much larger. Similarly, in officially atheist North Korea, while Buddhists officially account for 4.5% of the population, a much larger number (over 80%) of the population are influenced by Buddhist and Confucianist customs and philosophies.

Classification with Atheism
While irreligion makes up about 50% of South Korea's population, only 12% of South Koreans were "convinced atheists.", according to a 2012 Gallup International poll."

Demographics

South Koreans with no religious affiliation by year (1985-2015)

South Koreans with no religious affiliation by age (2015)

South Koreans with no religious affiliation by gender (2015)

History 
Prior to the 20th century, Korean society was Neo-Confucian, and most Koreans were nontheists, who were not concerned with the question of whether or not God existed. Following the division of Korea in the mid-20th century, approximately 88% of South Koreans said they had no religious affiliation in 1964. While religiousness in South Korea experienced a sharp rise in the 20th century, the majority of South Koreans (56%) had no religious affiliation as of 2015 national census. According to a 2012 Gallup International poll, 15% of South Koreans said they were "convinced atheists," an increase from 11% in 2005.

According to some experts, contemporary irreligion in South Korea can be partially attributed to South Koreans' distrust of hierarchical organizations like religious groups. Experts also point to South Korea's demanding education and work systems as reasons why few young South Koreans participate in organized religion.

See also
 Religion in South Korea

Notes

References

Religion in South Korea
South Korea